Peter Falconio was a British tourist who disappeared in a remote part of the Stuart Highway near Barrow Creek in the Northern Territory of Australia on the evening of 14 July 2001, while travelling with his girlfriend Joanne Lees.

In the aftermath of the backpacker murders, the case quickly attracted considerable public and legal attention both domestically and worldwide. Falconio was 28 years old at the time of the disappearance. His body has never been found and he is now presumed dead. On 13 December 2005, Bradley John Murdoch was convicted of Falconio's murder and sentenced to life imprisonment.

Background

Peter Marco Falconio (20 September 1972 – 14 July 2001) was the third of four sons in a family who lived in Hepworth, West Yorkshire, England, United Kingdom. In 1996, he started a relationship with Joanne Lees (born 1973) after meeting her in a local nightclub. Lees soon began living with him the following year in Brighton, where Falconio was studying at Brighton University.

On 15 November 2000, the couple embarked on a trip to Nepal, Singapore, Malaysia, Thailand, Cambodia and Australia (though recent news of the backpacker murders, the Port Arthur massacre, and the Childers Palace Backpackers Hostel fire had made their families anxious about that final leg of this trip). By 16 January 2001, the couple had arrived in Sydney on a working holiday visa, and on 25 June they departed on a road trip planned as Sydney to Canberra, Melbourne, Adelaide, Darwin, and Brisbane.

Around 7:30pm on the night of Saturday 14 July 2001, Falconio and Lees were travelling on the Stuart Highway bound for the Devil's Marbles in their orange Kombi. Falconio was driving and Lees sat next to him in the passenger seat. The two had been conscious of a car that had been following them since they stopped at a roadhouse in Barrow Creek, and were expecting to be overtaken. However, when the vehicle - a white Toyota 4WD with a green canopy - drew alongside, the driver gestured excitedly at them to pull over. Falconio stopped the van and went to speak with the man, who had pulled off the road ahead of them. The man explained he had seen sparks shooting out of the van's exhaust.

As the two went to the rear of the vehicle to investigate Lees moved into the driver's seat, ready to rev the engine. She then heard a loud bang from the rear of the van, and moments later the man was at the window brandishing a silver handgun. The gunman climbed into the van. Lees let him secure her hands behind her back with black cable ties, but fought the tying of her feet and taping of her mouth. She was then dragged to the Toyota (noticing the gunman's dog) but, fearing rape, managed to flee into the bush while the gunman was distracted (apparently while moving Falconio's body). The gunman searched for Lees before leaving, passing nearby three times, but she hid before finally flagging down a road train driver at 12:35 am, who with his co-driver took her back to Barrow Creek.

Investigation 

The Alice Springs Police were called around 1:30am, arrived to collect evidence and testimonies at around 4:20am, and (accompanied by the road train driver) commenced a search for Falconio, the Toyota, and the gunman at 7:00 am. Returning to the scene, they found a dirt-covered pool of blood and the couple's Kombi hidden some 80 metres into the scrub. It was not until eight hours after the rescue that roadblocks were put in place on the twelve likely roads exiting the district. Police searches of the area in the following months revealed little except Lees' footprints. Four Aboriginal trackers arrived from a nearby settlement within a few days but none of them found evidence of either Falconio or the gunman.

Given the unusual nature of the attack, and the lack of corroborating evidence (i.e. Falconio's belongings or body), it took the police some days to appreciate the significance of the crime. But in the wake of the backpacker case, the media were quick to sensationalise Lees' story as one of survival in a crime of unusual horror against all odds. However, inconsistencies in Lees' statements and her demeanour in the following weeks shifted attention to the veracity of her version of the incident (e.g. the perpetrator's facial composite, the actual type of vehicle or dog, and assumed CCTV footage of the suspect from a service station in Alice Springs), similar to what had happened in the Azaria Chamberlain case. A $250,000 reward was posted, but the only new evidence in the Falconio case was an unidentified male-DNA trace on Lees' T-shirt, and some related DNA on the cable ties and Kombi gearstick.

Police were hopeful that the release of the CCTV footage would lead to the person shown coming forward to remove themselves from suspicion. When this did not happen, investigators began to focus on the registered owners of the 1991-1999 model Toyota Land Cruiser 4WD identified, and on the thirty-six men whom callers had identified in the footage. Based on these results, police interviewed Bradley John Murdoch in Broome on 1 November 2001, though Lees' descriptions did not immediately connect the case to him and no DNA sample was collected. On 17 May 2002, investigators caught Murdoch's drug-running accomplice, who began to relate details of his connections to the case, and a DNA examination of Murdoch's brother also supported his involvement. Murdoch then disappeared, but on 22 August 2002 he was arrested and tried on an unrelated kidnap and assault charge by South Australia Police.

Murder trial 
After extradition, a committal hearing began in April 2005. The trial began on 17 October of that year before the Supreme Court of the Northern Territory in Darwin. To cope with the demands of the trial and the huge media contingent covering the proceedings, the court building in Darwin was renovated at a cost of A$900,000. The judge was Brian Ross Martin QC, Chief Justice of the Northern Territory. Murdoch pleaded not guilty to charges of murdering Falconio and assaulting and attempting to kidnap Lees.

Lees had identified Murdoch from police photographs shown to her in November 2002 and finally face-to-face during the trial on 18 October. She also told the court that her assailant tied her wrists together behind her, put a sack over her head and forced her into his ute (pickup truck), stating that the person forced her between the seats of and into the rear of his vehicle. Lees said she escaped from the ute and fled into the dark, hiding under bushes, while Murdoch tried to find her using a torch. Expert trackers could find no sign of footprints other than those of Lees in the vicinity.

Murdoch was found to have left Alice Springs at a time and in a direction which were each consistent with him being at or around Barrow Creek at the time of the murder. Expert testimony presented at the trial indicated that he was the man captured in the CCTV footage at the service station at 12:38 am. This indication was later corroborated by Murdoch's own father as well as his business associate, James Helpi. The police found traces of Murdoch’s DNA on a pair of homemade handcuffs used in the attack. This, combined with the DNA match on Lees' T-shirt, allowed Murdoch to be charged with the murder. The T-shirt DNA was found to be "150 quadrillion times more likely [to] belong to Murdoch" than anyone else. His DNA was also found on the gearstick of the Kombi in which Falconio and Lees had been travelling, and which, subsequent to the attack on the Stuart Highway, was driven by the perpetrator into the bush.

Murdoch's defence argued during the trial that the DNA match could have been due to accidental blood transfer in an Alice Springs Red Rooster restaurant prior to the alleged offence, or could have been simply planted by persons unknown. Further samples were found to be contaminated and were not presented as evidence. Murdoch gave evidence that he had stopped at the restaurant to buy chicken for himself and his dog. During the committal hearing, Lees at one stage mentioned that she and Falconio had stopped at Red Rooster.

Eyewitnesses claimed they had seen Falconio at a petrol station one week after he went missing. Prosecutor Rex Wild QC dismissed these claims, arguing that each account gave conflicting information, in particular about the man's hair colour. He pointed out that the police had followed up various eyewitness accounts, all of which had proven fruitless. Falconio's body has never been found "despite one of the most exhaustive police investigations ever seen in Australia".

On 13 December 2005, Murdoch was found guilty by a jury in a unanimous verdict and he was sentenced to life imprisonment with a non-parole period of twenty-eight years. He was also convicted of other assault-related charges on Lees. Only after the sentencing was it revealed that Murdoch had previously been acquitted of aggravated sexual assault on a mother and daughter in South Australia some years earlier.

Appeals
On 12 December 2006, Murdoch appealed against his life sentence in the Supreme Court. His lawyers lodged eight grounds of appeal. Murdoch claimed the evidence of Lees was tainted because she had seen a photograph of him on the internet before she was interviewed by police, as well as an article linking him to the murder. On 10 January 2007, the Northern Territory Court of Criminal Appeal (NT CCA) dismissed both limbs of the appeal.

Murdoch then applied for Special Leave to appeal to the High Court of Australia. On 21 June 2007, the High Court refused to grant Special Leave. Under the Australian judicial system, Murdoch has now exhausted all opportunities of appeal. Subsequent to the High Court of Australia refusing to grant his application for Special Leave, there was media speculation that Murdoch would lodge a further appeal. He launched another appeal to the Northern Territory criminal court of appeal in 2013.

Later developments
In April 2006, The Bulletin reported that Murdoch had refused to be served chicken while incarcerated during the committal and trial, claiming he was allergic to it, and that he has a standing medical certificate at Darwin's maximum security Berrimah Prison where he had a "prison dietitian assigned to create a special menu" due to this allergy, requesting that he never be served chicken. This contradicted his defence at trial that his DNA might have been transferred onto Lees' clothing while buying chicken for himself and his dog.

In mid-August 2007, some sections of the Australian media speculated that Murdoch might soon reveal the whereabouts of Falconio's remains. Specifically, the press mentioned that Murdoch did not enjoy the conditions of the Berrimah Prison and might reveal the location of the body in exchange for a transfer to a prison in Western Australia, given that all avenues of appeal had been exhausted. Murdoch himself has spoken out against this idea.

Author Keith Allan Noble insists Murdoch is innocent and offers a reward of £25,000 to anyone who can prove that Falconio is still alive. His 2011 book Find! Falconio outlines what he describes as "the show trial in which the jury was lied to and pressure-cooked resulting in a shocking miscarriage of justice". Noble's writings, which also cover the Port Arthur massacre, have been described by several journalists as conspiracy theories.

In April 2017, the NT News received an anonymous letter claiming that Murdoch had "cut [Falconio]'s body up" and placed it in two large bags. The letter claimed that an associate was asked to dissolve the remains in acid and dispose of them in the Swan River in Perth, but the associate had instead gone past Geraldton and buried the bags unopened in remote Western Australia. The NT News forwarded the letter to Northern Territory Police, who said they were reviewing the letter.

Media
In 2005, while Murdoch's trial was still under way, the film Wolf Creek was released in Australia. As the film was marketed as being "based on true events", the Northern Territory court placed an injunction on its release within the Territory in the belief that it could influence the outcome of the proceedings. However, the movie was inspired by other murders around Australia, such as the backpacker murders, as well as the Falconio case.

Lees agreed to a televised interview with Martin Bashir which was later televised in Australia, for which she was paid £50,000. She later testified in court that she had agreed to the interview to raise awareness of Falconio's murder in Australia, as she felt the public profile of the case had diminished.

Lees wrote No Turning Back, a book about her life. She went to England for the launch of the book in October 2006 and a serialisation appeared in The Times newspaper on 2 and 3 October. On 10 October 2006, Lees was interviewed by BBC News 24.

In March 2007, Australia's Channel Ten presented a docudrama covering the murder and trial from Lees' perspective, entitled Joanne Lees: Murder in the Outback. The roles of Lees and Falconio were played by Joanne Froggatt and Laurence Breuls, respectively. It was also shown by ITV1 in the United Kingdom on 8 April 2007, by TV One in New Zealand on 10 June 2007, and by RTL 2 in Germany on 12 January 2009. The case was also covered by Casefile True Crime Podcast on 28 January 2017.

In June 2020, Channel 4 in the UK and Australia’s Channel Seven broadcast a four-part documentary series entitled Murder in the Outback: The Falconio and Lees Mystery.

Bibliography
And then the Darkness (2005) by Sue Williams 
Where's Peter? (2005) by Roger Maynard 
No Turning Back (2007) by Joanne Lees 
Bloodstain (2011) by Richard Shears 
Find! Falconio (2012) by Keith Allan Noble 
Dead Centre (2020) by Robin Bowles

References

External links 
 Casefile True Crime Podcast - Case 44: Peter Falconio - 28 January 2017

1973 births
2001 deaths
2001 in Australia
2000s missing person cases
2001 murders in Australia
2000s in the Northern Territory
Alumni of the University of Brighton
British people murdered abroad
English people of Italian descent
Missing person cases in Australia
People murdered in the Northern Territory
Murder convictions without a body